Triplemanía XII was the twelfth Triplemanía professional wrestling show promoted by AAA. The show took place on June 20, 2004 in Naucalpan, Mexico like the previous year’s event. The Main event featured a Lucha de Apuestas "Mask vs. mask" match between La Parka and Cibernético.

Production

Background
In early 1992 Antonio Peña was working as a booker and storyline writer for Consejo Mundial de Lucha Libre (CMLL), Mexico's largest and the world's oldest wrestling promotion, and was frustrated by CMLL's very conservative approach to lucha libre. He joined forced with a number of younger, very talented wrestlers who felt like CMLL was not giving them the recognition they deserved and decided to split from CMLL to create Asistencia Asesoría y Administración, later known simply as "AAA" or Triple A. After making a deal with the Televisa television network AAA held their first show in April 1992. The following year Peña and AAA held their first Triplemanía event, building it into an annual event that would become AAA's Super Bowl event, similar to the WWE's WrestleMania being the biggest show of the year. The 2004 Triplemanía was the 12th year in a row AAA held a Triplemanía show and the 17th overall show under the Triplemanía banner.

Storylines
The Triplemanía XII show featured six professional wrestling matches with different wrestlers involved in pre-existing scripted feuds, plots and storylines. Wrestlers were portrayed as either heels (referred to as rudos in Mexico, those that portray the "bad guys") or faces (técnicos in Mexico, the "good guy" characters) as they followed a series of tension-building events, which culminated in a wrestling match or series of matches.

Results

References

External links
Triplemanía XII at LuchaLibreAAA.com

2004 in professional wrestling
Triplemanía
June 2004 events in Mexico